Rodan was an American post-hardcore band from Louisville, Kentucky. The best known lineup of the band consisted of Jeff Mueller (guitar/vocals), Jason Noble (guitar/vocals), Tara Jane O'Neil (bass/vocals), and Kevin Coultas (drums).

History

1992–1993: Formation, Aviary, early demos 
Rodan formed in Louisville, Kentucky, in 1992. After quickly passing through drummers Jon Cook and John Weiss, the band's roster was solidified by the addition of Kevin Coultas in 1993. In 1993, they recorded their Aviary demo, which saw limited release. Later that year, two songs from Aviary, "Milk and Melancholy" and "Exoskeleton", were rerecorded and released as How the Winter Was Passed.

1994: Rusty, Half-cocked 
Six of the songs on the Aviary demo were re-recorded by Bob "Rusty" Weston (of Shellac fame), and released in 1994 as the album Rusty. The band starred in the 1994 cult road movie Half-cocked; they also contributed music to the film's soundtrack. Although they were never signed to the label, Rodan was close to Simple Machines, contributing to several compilations and playing at the label's Working Holiday festival. The band also had a Peel session in 1995.

1995–present: Disbandment, future projects 
Rodan broke up in 1995, with the members pursuing other musical interests. O'Neil joined Retsin and began a solo career, Mueller joined June of 44, Coultas and Noble joined Rachel's, and Coultas and O'Neil joined The Sonora Pine. Mueller and Noble started Shipping News in 1996, and continued to perform until Noble died from synovial sarcoma in 2012. 

In Fearless, Jeanette Leech's book on the history of the post-rock genre, Rodan is discussed in the chapter on the Louisville scene.

Mueller co-founded the band June of 44 in 1994. O'Neil played in the bands The King Cobra, The Naysayer, and Retsin. Noble played in the chamber music group Rachel's which also featured contributions from Coultras and Mueller. 

Mueller and Noble also co-founded the band Shipping News in 1996 which was active until Noble's death in 2012. Noble was also part of the band Per Mission.

In 1996, O'Neil recruited Coultras to work with her on The Sonora Pine which disbanded the next year after releasing two albums. 

Weiss was part of the band Sunspring and Cook was active in the bands Crain and Cerebellum.

August 2012: Noble's death 
On August 4, 2012, Noble passed away from synovial sarcoma.

February 2013: Cook's death 
Original drummer Jon Cook died in February 2013.

Band members

Core members 

 Tara Jane O'Neil – bass guitar, vocals (1992–1995)
 Jeff Mueller – guitar, vocals (1992–1995)
 Jason Noble – guitar, vocals (1992–1995; died 2012)
 Kevin Coultas – drums, vocals (1993–1995)

Other members 

 Jon Cook – drums (1992; died 2013)
 John Weiss – drums (1992)

Discography

Studio albums
Rusty (1994)

Demos 

 Aviary (1993; self-released cassette demo)

EPs
How the Winter Was Passed EP (Three Little Girls Recordings, 1993)

Compilations
Fifteen Quiet Years (Quarterstick Records, 2013)
Hat Factory '93 (Quarterstick Records, 2019; LP/digital download)

Compilation appearances
Neither a Borrower Nor a Lender Bee (Bees Make Honey, year unknown) (song: "Tongue-Tied")
The Aftereffects of Insomnia, Vol. 2 (Three Little Girls Recordings, 1992) (song: "Shiner" [Demo])
Slamdek Merry Christmas Is for Rockers (Slamdek Records, 1992) (song: "Toothfairy Retribution Manifesto") 
The Machines 1990-1993 (Simple Machines Records, 1993) (song: "Darjeeling") 
Omphalos (Richie's Lemon-Herb Media, 1993) (song: "Tooth Fairy Retribution Manifesto") 
Inclined Plane (Simple Machines, 1993) (song: "Darjeeling") 
Working Holiday (Simple Machines, 1994) (song: "Big Things, Little Things") 
The Monsters of Rock II (Simple Machines, 1994) (song: "Tooth Fairy Retribution Manifesto" [Live]) 
CMJ New Music No. 10 (College Music Journal, May 1994) (song: "Tooth Fairy Retribution Manifesto") 
Louisville Babylon (Analog Distillery, 1994) (song: "Who Killed Marilyn") 
Compulsiv for Two 7" (Compulsiv Music 1994) (song: "Shiner") 
Half-Cocked (Matador, 1995) (song: "Tron") 
Slamdek A to Z. The Illustrated History of Louisville's Slamdek Record Company 1986-1995 (K Composite Media & Initial Records, 1996) (song: "Toothfairy Retribution Manifesto") 
Louisville Babylon 1994/2007 (Double Malt Music, 2007) (song: "Who Killed Marilyn?")

References

External links
 

Musical groups from Louisville, Kentucky
Math rock groups
Musical groups established in 1992
Musical groups disestablished in 1995
American post-hardcore musical groups
Quarterstick Records artists
Rock music groups from Kentucky
1992 establishments in Kentucky
1995 disestablishments in Kentucky